Harper's Magazine is a monthly magazine of literature, politics, culture, finance, and the arts. Launched in New York City in June 1850, it is the oldest continuously published monthly magazine in the U.S. (Scientific American is older, but it did not become monthly until 1921). Harper's Magazine has won 22 National Magazine Awards.

In the 19th and 20th centuries, the magazine published works of authors such as Herman Melville, Woodrow Wilson, and Winston Churchill. Willie Morris's resignation as editor in 1971 was considered a major event, and many other employees of the magazine resigned with him. The magazine has developed into the 21st century, adding several blogs. Harper's has been the subject of several controversies.

History

Harper's Magazine began as Harper's New Monthly Magazine in New York City in June 1850, by publisher Harper & Brothers. The company also founded the magazines Harper's Weekly and Harper's Bazaar, and grew to become HarperCollins Publishing. The first press run of Harper's Magazine—7,500 copies—sold out almost immediately. Circulation was some 50,000 issues six months later.

The early issues reprinted material pirated from English authors such as Charles Dickens, William Makepeace Thackeray, and the Brontë sisters. The magazine soon was publishing the work of American artists and writers, and in time commentary by the likes of Winston Churchill and Woodrow Wilson.  Portions of Herman Melville's novel Moby-Dick were first published in the October 1851 issue of Harper's under the title, "The Town-Ho's Story" (titled after Chapter 54 of Moby-Dick).

In 1962, Harper & Brothers merged with Row, Peterson & Company, becoming Harper & Row (now HarperCollins). In 1965, the magazine was separately incorporated, and became a division of the Minneapolis Star and Tribune Company, owned by the Cowles Media Company.

In the 1970s, Harper's Magazine published Seymour Hersh's reporting of the My Lai Massacre by United States forces in Vietnam. In 1971, editor Willie Morris resigned under pressure from owner John Cowles, Jr., prompting resignations from many of the magazine's star contributors and staffers, including Norman Mailer, David Halberstam, Robert Kotlowitz, Marshall Frady, and Larry L. King:

Robert Shnayerson, a senior editor at Time magazine, was hired to replace Morris as Harper's ninth editor, serving in that position from 1971 until 1976.

Lewis H. Lapham served as managing editor from 1976 until 1981; he returned to the position again from 1983 until 2006. On June 17, 1980, the Star Tribune announced it would cease publishing Harper's Magazine after the August 1980 issue, but on July 9, 1980, John R. MacArthur (who goes by the name Rick) and his father, Roderick, obtained pledges from the directorial boards of the John D. and Catherine T. MacArthur Foundation, the Atlantic Richfield Company, and CEO Robert Orville Anderson to amass the $1.5 million needed to establish the Harper's Magazine Foundation. It now publishes the magazine.

In 1984, Lapham and MacArthur—now publisher and president of the foundation—along with new executive editor Michael Pollan, redesigned Harper's and introduced the "Harper's Index" (statistics arranged for thoughtful effect), "Readings", and the "Annotation" departments to complement its fiction, essays, reportage, and reviews. As of the December 2019 issue, Julian Lucas writes the print edition's "New Books" column.

Under the Lapham-MacArthur leadership, Harper's Magazine continued publishing literary fiction by John Updike, George Saunders, and others. Politically, Harper's was an especially vocal critic of U.S. domestic and foreign policies. Editor Lapham's monthly "Notebook" columns have lambasted the Clinton and the George W. Bush administrations. Since 2003, the magazine has concentrated on reportage about U.S. war in Iraq, with long articles about the battle for Fallujah, and the cronyism of the American reconstruction of Iraq. Other reporting has covered abortion issues, cloning, and global warming.

In 2007, Harper's added the No Comment blog, by attorney Scott Horton, about legal controversies, Central Asian politics, and German studies. In April 2006, Harper's began publishing the Washington Babylon blog on its website, written by Washington Editor Ken Silverstein about American politics; and in 2008, Harper's added the Sentences blog, by contributing editor Wyatt Mason, about literature and belles lettres.  Since that time these two blogs have ceased publication. Another website feature, composed by a rotating set of authors, is the "Weekly Review", a three-paragraph distillation of the week's political, scientific, and bizarre news; like the "Harper's Index" and "Findings" in the print edition of the magazine, the "Weekly Review" items are typically arranged for ironic contrast.

Controversies
Editor Lewis H. Lapham was criticized for his reportage of the 2004 Republican National Convention, which had yet to occur, in his essay "Tentacles of Rage: The Republican Propaganda Mill, a Brief History", published in the September 2004 issue, which implied that he had attended the convention. He apologized in a note. Lapham left two years later, after 28 years as Harper's editor-in-chief, and launched Lapham's Quarterly.

The August 2004 issue contained a photo essay by noted photojournalist Peter Turnley, hired to do a series of photo essays for the magazine. The eight-page spread in August 2004 showed images of death, grieving, and funerals from both sides of the U.S. war in Afghanistan. On the U.S. side, Turnley visited the funeral of an Oklahoma National Guard member, Spc. Kyle Brinlee, 21, who was killed when his vehicle ran over an improvised explosive device (IED) in Afghanistan. During his funeral, Turnley photographed the open casket as it lay in the back of the high-school auditorium where the funeral was held to accommodate 1,200 mourners, and this photo was used in the photo essay. Subsequently, the family sued the magazine in federal court. The case ended in 2007 when the U.S. Supreme Court, although saying the unauthorized publication was in "poor taste", upheld the ruling of the Tenth Circuit that the magazine had not violated the privacy rights of the family, as the family had invited the press, thus had "opened up the funeral scene to the public eye".

The March 2006 issue contained Celia Farber's article, "Out of Control: AIDS and the Corruption of Medical Science", presenting Peter Duesberg's theory that HIV does not cause AIDS. It was strongly criticized by AIDS activists, scientists and physicians, the Columbia Journalism Review, and others as inaccurate and promoting a scientifically discredited theory. The Treatment Action Campaign, a South African organization working for greater popular access to HIV treatments, posted a response by eight researchers documenting more than 50 errors in the article.

Lewis Lapham was succeeded as Harper's editor by Roger Hodge in 2006. Since that time, the magazine has had a number of shorter-termed editors in chief, several of whom were fired amid various controversies. On January 25, 2010, the firing of the magazine's editor, Roger Hodge, by publisher John R. MacArthur was met with criticism among the magazine's subscribers and staff. MacArthur initially claimed Hodge was stepping down for "personal reasons", but later disclosed that he fired Hodge.

Ellen Rosenbush served from 2010 to 2015. She returned in January 2016, when MacArthur fired Christopher Cox, who had been named editor only three months prior in October 2015. 

James Marcus assumed the post of editor in 2016. In March 2018, an essay by Katie Roiphe on the #MeToo movement excited controversy both online and inside Harper's. Marcus had complained about the piece, suggesting the critique of #MeToo was inappropriate in light of Harper's "longtime reputation as a gentleman's smoking club"; he attributed this disagreement as a primary cause of his firing in 2018. In April 2018, Ellen Rosenbush assumed the title of editorial director. In October 2019, the magazine announced that novelist and essayist Christopher Beha would be taking over as editor, with Rosenbush remaining as editor-at-large.

In July 2020, Harper's published an open letter called "A Letter on Justice and Open Debate" criticizing "illiberalism" and promoting a tolerance of different viewpoints. The letter received a mixed response on Twitter, with some remarking that the prominent signatories had "bigger platforms and more resources than most other humans" and were unlikely to face repercussions for anything they said, and others taking umbrage at particular signatories such as J. K. Rowling, who faced recent criticism for her comments on transgender issues.

Notable contributors

 Horatio Alger
 Frederic H. Balfour
 Wendell Berry
 John Dickson Carr
 John R. Chapin
 Noam Chomsky
 Winston Churchill
 Florence Earle Coates
 Alexander Cockburn
 Diane Cook
 Rebecca Curtis
 Roald Dahl
 Bernard DeVoto
 Stephen A. Douglas
 Theodore Dreiser
 Irwin Edman
 Barbara Ehrenreich
 Ralph Ellison
 Sol Eytinge Jr.
 Lucine Finch
 Thomas Frank
 Jonathan Franzen
 Robert Frost
 Barbara Garson
 John Taylor Gatto
 Horace Greeley
 Barbara Grizzuti Harrison
 Seymour Hersh
 Christopher Hitchens
 Edward Hoagland
 Richard Hofstadter
 Winslow Homer
 Jim Hougan
 Irving Howe
 William Dean Howells
 Henry James
 Naomi Klein
 Ben Lerner
 Jack London
 Fitz Hugh Ludlow
 Norman Mailer
 Herman Melville
 Stanley Milgram
 John Stuart Mill
 Hamilton Morris
 John Muir
 Thomas Nast
 Albert Jay Nock
 Joyce Carol Oates
 Cynthia Ozick
 Kevin Phillips
 Marjorie Pickthall
 Sylvia Plath
 Michael Pollan
 Frederic Remington
 Marilynne Robinson
 Richard Rodriguez
 Theodore Roosevelt
 Philip Roth
 J. D. Salinger
 George Saunders
 Miranda July
 David Samuels
 Herman George Scheffauer
 Isaac Bashevis Singer
 Jane Smiley
 Zadie Smith
 Rebecca Solnit
 Terry Southern
 John Steinbeck
 Henry L. Stimson
 Alfred Thomas Story
 Susan Straight
 Booth Tarkington
 Sara Teasdale
 Hunter S. Thompson
 Mark Twain
 John Updike
 Kurt Vonnegut
 William T. Vollmann
 Adelaide Cilley Waldron
 David Foster Wallace
 H. G. Wells
 E. B. White
 Woodrow Wilson
 Owen Wister
 Tom Wolfe
 Howard Zinn
 Slavoj Žižek

Gallery

References

Further reading

External links

 
 Official archive 
 Guide to Harper's Magazine on the Internet (from the Online Books Page)
 Harper's Magazine at the Internet Archive
 Harper's New Monthly Magazine digital archive at Hathi Trust
 

 
1850 establishments in New York (state)
Literary magazines published in the United States
Magazines established in 1850
Magazines published in New York City
Modern liberal magazines published in the United States
Monthly magazines published in the United States
News magazines published in the United States
Political magazines published in the United States